Naveen Polishetty (born 26 December 1989) is an Indian actor and screenwriter who works in Telugu and Hindi films. He made his debut as a lead in the film Agent Sai Srinivasa Athreya (2019), for which he received Zee Cine Awards Telugu – Best Find of the Year. He later made his Hindi debut in the film Chhichhore (2019). In 2021, he starred in the comedy film Jathi Ratnalu, which was successful at the box office.

Early life 
Polishetty was born into a middle class family in Hyderabad, India. His father is in the pharmaceutical business while his mother is a bank employee. He has an elder brother and an elder sister who are twins. Both his siblings are settled in the United States. He graduated in Civil engineering, from Maulana Azad National Institute of Technology (also known as NIT Bhopal) and joined a software firm in Pune. He later moved to England to work as an engineer, but wasn't happy with his job at all. He then secretly returned to India without informing his parents, and started to live in Mumbai by renting a house and doing some part-time jobs to pursue a full-time career in acting. He started working in theatre and performed in several plays.

Career
Polishetty made his debut with the Telugu film Life Is Beautiful (2012). He also played a minor role in the Mahesh Babu-starrer 1: Nenokkadine (2014). As his subsequent Telugu projects were either shelved films or replaced by other actors, Polishetty moved to theatre and stand-up comedy.

Later, he collaborated with All India Bakchod to make YouTube skits. He got wide response for his portrayal of an "average" guy in Honest Engineering Campus Placements.  

In 2019, Polishetty returned to Telugu cinema with the comedy thriller film Agent Sai Srinivasa Athreya, which he co-wrote and played the lead. The film won him the Zee Cine Awards Telugu – Best Film of the Year . He then made his Hindi cinema debut in Nitesh Tiwari's Chhichhore. Both the films performed very well at box office. He then starred in the 2021 comedy film Jathi Ratnalu. The film was commercially successful at the box office, with a gross collection of ₹70 crore. The film thus emerged as Polishetty's biggest success. Anupama Chopra felt that his character Jogipet Srikanth, is "terrific" and "a charming everyman". In May 2021, he signed a film alongside Anushka Shetty under UV Creations banner and will be next featured in the sequel of his previous film Jathi Ratnalu. Polishetty will reprise his role in that film from the first part.

Filmography

Films

 All films are in Telugu unless otherwise noted.

Television 
Shows are in Hindi.

Awards and nominations

References

External links
 

Living people
Male actors from Hyderabad, India
Male actors in Telugu cinema
Male actors in Hindi cinema
Indian male film actors
Indian male comedians
Indian male stage actors
21st-century Indian male actors
Male actors in Hindi television
1989 births
Telugu male actors
Zee Cine Awards Telugu winners